Sean Christopher McMullen (born 21 December 1948 in Sale, Victoria) is an Australian science fiction and fantasy author.

Biography

McMullen is one of Australia's leading science-fiction and fantasy authors and has written over 70 stories and 17 books. In 2011, his novelette "Eight Miles" was the runner-up in the Hugo Awards. He has won the Analog Reader's Award twice, for "Ninety Thousand Horses" in 2013 and "Tower of Wings" in 2002.

His first novel was originally published in Australia as two separate books, Voices in the Light (1994) and Mirrorsun Rising (1995). His first internationally published novel was The Centurion's Empire (1998), which featured a time machine built during the Roman Empire. After this book's success, his first two novels were rewritten and combined for a publication in the US as Souls in the Great Machine (1999), which, in turn, became the first volume of the Greatwinter trilogy, a unique mix of the generally anti-genres steampunk and cyberpunk. This was followed by the Moonworlds series, which saw McMullen blend science and romance in a fantasy setting. His most recent series is the Century War series for young adult readers, set in Melbourne in 1901.

McMullen's non-fiction work includes Strange Constellations: A History of Australian Science Fiction, a history of Australian science fiction jointly written with Van Ikin and Russell Blackford. He also co-wrote the first histories of Australian fantasy and horror with Steven Paulsen.

McMullen has a degree in physics and history from Melbourne University (1974), a postgraduate degree in library and information science, and a PhD in Medieval Literature.

He was a professional musician in the 1970s, concentrating on singing and guitar playing. 

McMullen has recently retired from a career in scientific computing to concentrate on his literary work.

He is a fourth dan black belt in karate, teaching at the Melbourne University Karate club.

He is the father of C. S. McMullen, an Australian speculative fiction author.

Bibliography

Novels
Voices in the Light (1994)
Mirrorsun Rising (1995)
The Centurion's Empire (1998)
The Ancient Hero (2004, part of the Quentaris Chronicles)
Before the Storm (2007)
Greatwinter series
Souls in the Great Machine (1999, a rewritten version of Voices in the Light and Mirrorsun Rising)
The Miocene Arrow (2000)
Eyes of the Calculor (2001)
The Moonworlds Saga series
Voyage of the Shadowmoon (2002)
Glass Dragons (2004)
Voidfarer (2006)
The Time Engine (2008)

Short fiction 
Collections
Call to the Edge (1992)
Walking to the Moon (2007)
Ghosts of Engines Past (2013)
Colours of the Soul (2013)
Stories

"At the Focus" (1986 with Paul Collins) in Eidolon (Australian magazine) Spring 1990 (ed. Jeremy G. Byrne)
"The Deciad" (1986) in Call to the Edge
"The Colors of the Masters" (1988) in The Magazine of Fantasy & Science Fiction March 1988 (ed. Edward L. Ferman)
"While the Gate Is Open" (1990) in The Magazine of Fantasy & Science Fiction February 1990 (ed. Edward L. Ferman)
"Alone in His Chariot" (1991) in Eidolon Summer 1991 (ed. Jeremy G. Byrne)
"The Dominant Style" (1991) in Aurealis No. 4 (ed. Stephen Higgins, Dirk Strasser)
"The Eyes of the Green Lancer" (1992) in Call to the Edge
"Destroyer of Illusions" (1992) in Call to the Edge
"The Porphyric Plague" (1992) in Intimate Armageddons (ed. Bill Congreve)
"Pax Romana" (1992) in Call to the Edge
"The Devils of Langenhagen" (1992) in Call to the Edge
"An Empty Wheelhouse" (1992) in Analog Science Fiction and Fact January 1992 (ed. Stanley Schmidt)
"Souls in the Great Machine" (1992) in Universe 2 (ed. Karen Haber, Robert Silverberg)
"The Glasken Chronicles" (1992) in Eidolon Autumn 1992 (ed. Jeremy G. Byrne)
"Pacing the Nightmare" (1992) in Interzone May 1992 (ed. David Pringle, Lee Montgomerie)
"A Greater Vision" (1992) in Analog Science Fiction and Fact October 1992 (ed. Stanley Schmidt)
"The Way to Greece" (1993) in Eidolon Winter 1993 (ed. Jeremy G. Byrne, Jonathan Strahan)
"Charon's Anchor" (1993) in Aurealis No. 12 (ed. Stephen Higgins, Dirk Strasser)
"The Miocene Arrow" (1994) in Alien Shores: An Anthology of Australian Science Fiction (ed. Peter McNamara, Margaret Winch)
"The Blondefire Genome" (1994) in The Lottery: Nine Science Fiction Stories (ed. Lucy Sussex)
"A Ring of Green Fire" (1994) in Interzone November 1994 (ed. David Pringle, Lee Montgomerie)
"Lucky Jonglar" (1996) in Dream Weavers (ed. Paul Collins)
"The Weakest Link" (1996, written as Roger Wilcox) in Dream Weavers (ed. Paul Collins)
"Slow Famine" (1996) in Interzone May 1996 (ed. David Pringle)
"Queen of Soulmates" (1998) in Dreaming Down-Under (ed. Jack Dann, Janeen Webb)
"Chronicler" (1998) in Fantastic Worlds (ed. Paul Collins)
"Rule of the People" (1998) in Aurealis #20/21, (ed. Stephen Higgins, Dirk Strasser)
"Souls in the Great machine" (1999) an excerpt in The Centurion's Empire "New Words of Power" (1999) in Interzone August 1999 (ed. David Pringle)
"Colours of the Soul" (2000) in Interzone February 2000 (ed. David Pringle)
"Unthinkable" (2000) in Analog Science Fiction and Fact June 2000 (ed. Stanley Schmidt)
"Mask of Terminus" (2000) in Analog Science Fiction and Fact October 2000 (ed. Stanley Schmidt)
"Voice of Steel" (2001)
"Tower of Wings" (2001) in Analog Science Fiction and Fact December 2001 (ed. Stanley Schmidt)
"SVYAGATOR" (2002) in Andromeda Spaceways Inflight Magazine No. 3 (ed. Ian Nichols)
"Walk to the Full Moon" (2002) in The Magazine of Fantasy & Science Fiction December 2002 (ed. Gordon Van Gelder)
"The Cascade" (2004) in Agog! Smashing Stories (ed. Cat Sparks)
"The Empire of the Willing" (2005) in Future Washington (ed. Ernest Lilley)
"The Engines of Arcadia" (2006) in Futureshocks (ed. Lou Anders)
"The Twilight Year" (2008) in The Magazine of Fantasy & Science Fiction January 2008 (ed. Gordon Van Gelder)
"The Constant Past" (2008) in Dreaming Again (ed. Jack Dann)
"The Spiral Briar" (2009) in The Magazine of Fantasy & Science Fiction April–May 2009 (ed. Gordon Van Gelder)
"The Art of the Dragon" (2009) in The Magazine of Fantasy & Science Fiction August–September 2009 (ed. Gordon Van Gelder)
"Mother of Champions" (2009) in "Interzone" No. 222 (ed. Andy Cox)
"Eight Miles" in "Analog" September 2010 (ed. Stanley Schmidt)
"Enigma" in "Analog" Jan/Feb 2010 (ed. Stanley Schmidt)
"Spacebook" in "Anywhere But Earth" 2011 (ed. Keith Stevenson)
"Ninety Thousand Horses" in "Analog" Jan/Feb 2012 (ed. Stanley Schmidt)
"Electrica" in "The Magazine of Fantasy & Science Fiction" March/April 2012 (ed. Gordon Van Gelder)
"Steamgothic" in "Interzone" July/August 2012 (ed. Andy Cox)
"Hard Cases" in Light Touch Paper, Stand Clear 2012 (ed. Edwina Harvey and Simon Petrie)
"The First Boat" in "Aurealis" March 2012 (ed. Michael Pryor)
"Running Invisible" in "Trust Me Too" 2012 (ed. Paul Collins)
"Culverelle" in "The Feathered Edge" 2012 (ed. Deborah J. Ross)
"Lost Faces" in "The Magazine of Fantasy & Science Fiction" March/April 2013 (ed. Gordon Van Gelder)
"The Firewall and the Door" in "Analog" March 2013 (ed. Trevor Quachri)
"Acts of Chivaltry" in "Tales of Australia – Great Southern Land" 2013 (ed. Stephen C. Ormsby)
"Technarion" (2013) in "Interzone" Sept/Oct 2013 (ed. Andy Cox)

Non-fiction
Books
 The MUP Encyclopaedia of Australian Science Fiction & Fantasy (1998, assistant editor with Paul Collins)Strange Constellations: A History of Australian Science Fiction (1999 with Russell Blackford and Van Ikin)
Essays and articles
Beyond Our Shores (1990) in Eidolon Winter 1990
The High Brick Wall (1990) in Eidolon Spring 1990 (ed. Jeremy G. Byrne)
Not in Print but Worth Millions (1991) in Eidolon Winter 1991 (ed. Jeremy G. Byrne)
Book Review (1991) in Aurealis No. 5 (ed. Stephen Higgins, Dirk Strasser)
Going Commercial and Becoming Professional (1991) in Eidolon Spring 1991 (ed. Jeremy G. Byrne)
Australian SF Art Turns 50 (1992) in Eidolon Summer 1992 (ed. Jonathan Strahan, Jeremy G. Byrne)
Far from Void: The History of Australian SF Magazines (1992) in Aurealis #7 (ed. Stephen Higgins, Dirk Strasser)
Skirting the Frontier (1992) in Eidolon Autumn 1992 (ed. Jeremy G. Byrne)
Showcase or Leading Edge: Australian SF Anthologies 1968–1990 (1992) in Aurealis #9, (ed. Stephen Higgins, Dirk Strasser)
From Science Fantasy to Galileo (1992) in Eidolon Spring 1992 (ed. Jeremy G. Byrne, Jonathan Strahan)
Australian Content: The State of Quarantine (1993) in Eidolon Summer 1993 (ed. Jeremy G. Byrne, Jonathan Strahan)
Australian Content: Suffering for Someone Else's Art (1993) in Eidolon Autumn 1993 (ed. Jonathan Strahan, Jeremy G. Byrne)
Protection, Liberation and the Cold, Dangerous Universe: The Great Australian SF Renaissance (1993) in Aurealis #11, (ed. Stephen Higgins, Dirk Strasser)
No Science Fiction Please, We're Australian (1993) in Eidolon Winter 1993 (ed. Jeremy G. Byrne, Jonathan Strahan)
The Quest for Australian Fantasy (1994, with Steven Paulsen) in Aurealis No. 13, (ed. Stephen Higgins, Dirk Strasser)
Australian Content: The Great Transition (1994) in Eidolon Winter 1994 (ed. Jonathan Strahan, Jeremy G. Byrne)
The Hunt for Australian Horror Fiction (1994, with Steven Paulsen) in Aurealis No. 14 (ed. Stephen Higgins, Dirk Strasser)
A History of Australian Horror (1995, with Bill Congreve and Steve Paulsen) in Bonescribes: Year's Best Australian Horror: 1995 (ed. Bill Congreve, Robert Hood)
SF in Australia (1995, with Terry Dowling) in Locus January 1995 (ed. Charles N. Brown)
Australian Content: Recognition Australian Style (1995) in Eidolon Summer 1995 (ed. Jeremy G. Byrne)
Australia: Australian Contemporary Fantasy (1997, with Steven Paulsen)
George Turner and the Nova Mob (1997) in Eidolon, Issue 25/26 Spring 1997 (ed. Jonathan Strahan, Jeremy G. Byrne, Richard Scriven)
The Road to 1996 (1998, with Terry Dowling) in Nebula Awards 32 (ed. Jack Dann)
The British Benchmark (1999) in Interzone August 1999 (ed. David Pringle)
Time Travel, Times Scapes, and Timescape (2000, with Russell Blackford, Alison Goodman, Damien Broderick, Aubrey Townsend, Gregory Benford) in The New York Review of Science Fiction August 2000, (ed. Kathryn Cramer, David G. Hartwell, Kevin J. Maroney)
25 (Celebrating 25 Years of Interzone) (2007) in Interzone'' September–October 2007 (ed. Andrew Hedgecock, Jetse de Vries, Andy Cox)

Awards 
Hugo Awards

2011 Runner-up, Best Novelette – "Eight Miles"

Ditmar Awards

1991 	Best Australian Short Fiction – While the Gate is Open

1992 	Best Short Fiction – Alone in His Chariot; William Atheling Jr. Award for Criticism – Going Commercial

1993 William Atheling Jr. Award for Criticism – Australian SF Art Turns 50

1996 	Best Australian Long Fiction – Mirrorsun Rising; William Atheling Jr Award for Criticism – The Hunt for Australian Horror Fiction (together with Steven Paulsen and Bill Congreve)

1998 	William Atheling Jr Award for Criticism – Fantasy in Australia (together with Steven Paulsen)

2000 	William Atheling Jr Award for Criticism – Strange Constellations (together with Van Ikin and Russell Blackford)

Aurealis Awards

1998 	Best Novel – The Centurion's Empire

2001 	Best Novel – The Miocene Arrow

2003 	Best Short Story -Walk to the Moon

Analog Reader's Award  	

2002 Best Novellette  – Tower of Wings

2013 Best Novellette – Ninety Thousand Horses

Nova Fantastyka Reader's Award

2003 Best Foreign Story  – Voice of Steel

References

 Festivale Online Magazine, Summer 2008–09, ISSN 1328-8008

External links
 Homepage of Sean McMullen

1948 births
Living people
Analog Science Fiction and Fact people
Australian fantasy writers
Australian science fiction writers